is a common feminine Japanese given name.

Possible writings 
Ayaka can be written using different kanji characters and can mean:
 彩華, "colorful, "flower"
 彩夏, "colorful, summer"
 彩霞, "colorful, mist"
 彩香, "colorful, scent"
 彩風, "colorful, wind"
 綾花, "design, flower"
 綾香, "design, scent"
 綾風, "design, wind"
 綾夏, "design, summer"
 絢花, "kimono design, flower"
 絢香, "kimono design, scent"
 彩花, "colorful flower"
The name can also be written in hiragana or katakana.

People with the name 
Ayaka, a Japanese singer whose real name is Ayaka Iida (飯田 絢香)
Ayaka Fukuhara (福原綾香, born 1989), a Japanese voice actress
Ayaka Hibiki (響 綾香), a Japanese stage and voice actress
Ayaka Hirahara (平原 綾香), a Japanese pop singer
, Japanese TV announcer
Ayaka Imamura (今村 彩夏,born 1993), a former Japanese voice actress
, Japanese singer, actress, model and idol
, Japanese speed skater
Ayaka Kimura (木村 絢香), an actress who was a former member of the Hello! Project group Coconuts Musume
Ayaka Kitazawa (北沢 綾香), a Japanese pop singer
Ayaka Komatsu (小松 彩夏), a Japanese model/actress
, Japanese long jumper
, Japanese tennis player
, Japanese volleyball player
Ayaka Miyoshi (三吉 彩花, born 1996) a Japanese idol, singer, model and actress
Ayaka Nanase, a Japanese voice actress
Ayaka Nishiwaki (西脇 綾香), a member of the Japanese electropop group Perfume
Ayaka Ohashi (大橋 彩香), a Japanese voice actress
, Japanese tennis player
, Japanese voice actress
, Japanese karateka
Ayaka Suwa, a Japanese voice actress
, Japanese ice hockey player
Ayaka Yamashita (disambiguation), multiple people
 Ayaka Yoshimura, a member of Japanese pop group SweetS
Ayaka Sasaki, Japanese Singer, Idol
Ayaka Wada (和田 彩花), a former member of the Hello! Project group Angerme

Fictional characters 
Ayaka Kuroe, a character from the anime/manga series/light novel Strike Witches
Ayaka Shindou, a character from anime and light novel series Beyond the Boundary
Ayaka Usami, a main character from anime and manga series Gravitation
Ayaka Yukihiro, a supporting character in the anime and manga series Mahou Sensei Negima
Ayaka Kagari, a main character from the anime and manga series Witch Craft Works
Ayaka Kamisato, a main character from the Japanese-inspired region of Inazuma in Genshin Impact
Ayaka Sunohara, a main character from the anime and manga series Miss Caretaker of Sunohara-sou

Japanese feminine given names